Audrey Mary Totter (December 20, 1917 – December 12, 2013) was an American radio, film, and television actress and Metro-Goldwyn-Mayer contract player in the 1940s.

Early life
Audrey – some sources indicate "Audra" – Totter was born in 1917 and grew up in Joliet in Will County in northeastern Illinois. Her parents were John Totter, who was born in Slovenia with birth name Janez, and Ida Mae Totter. Her father was of Austro-Slovenian descent and her mother was Swedish American. She had two brothers, Folger and George, and a sister, Collette.

Totter graduated from Joliet High School, where she acted in school plays. She was a Methodist who began her career performing in several productions for her local church, as well as being involved with the YWCA players.

Career

Radio
Totter began her acting career in radio in the late 1930s in Chicago, only 40 miles northeast of Joliet. She played in soap operas, including Painted Dreams, Ma Perkins, and Bright Horizon.

Film
Following success in Chicago and New York City, Totter was signed to a seven-year film contract with Metro-Goldwyn-Mayer (MGM). She made her film debut in Main Street After Dark (1945) and established herself as a popular female lead in the 1940s. Due to Totter's limited skill as a singer, MGM used Harriet Lee as her voice double in the 1945 film, Dangerous Partners. Although she performed in various film genres, she became most widely known to movie audiences for her work in film noir. Looking back, Totter stated in August 1999, "The bad girls were so much fun to play. I wouldn't have wanted to play the Coleen Gray good-girl parts."

Among her successes were:

 The Postman Always Rings Twice (1946) with John Garfield and Lana Turner
 Lady in the Lake (1947) with Robert Montgomery and Jayne Meadows
 The Unsuspected (1947 for Warner Bros.) with Claude Rains
 High Wall (1947) with Robert Taylor
 The Saxon Charm (1948) with Robert Montgomery, Susan Hayward, and John Payne
 Alias Nick Beal (1949) with Ray Milland
 The Set-Up (1949) with Robert Ryan
 Any Number Can Play (1949) with Clark Gable and Alexis Smith
 Tension (1950) with Richard Basehart
 The Blue Veil (1951) with Jane Wyman 
 FBI Girl (1951) with Cesar Romero and George Brent 
 The Sellout (1952) with Walter Pidgeon, John Hodiak, and Paula Raymond

By the early 1950s, the tough-talking "dames" she was best known for portraying were no longer fashionable, and as MGM began streamlining its roster of contract players and  worked towards creating more family-themed films, Totter was released from her contract. She reportedly was dissatisfied with her MGM career and agreed to appear in Any Number Can Play only after Clark Gable intervened. After leaving MGM, she worked for Columbia Pictures and 20th Century Fox, but the quality of her films dropped, and by the late 1950s, her film career was in decline, though she continued to work steadily for television.

Television
In 1954, Totter appeared in the pilot episode of the later 1957–58 detective series, Meet McGraw (with Frank Lovejoy), and in 1955, she appeared in an episode of Science Fiction Theatre entitled "Spider, Inc." She appeared with Joseph Cotten and William Hopper in the 1957 episode "The Case of the Jealous Bomber" of NBC's anthology series, The Joseph Cotten Show. In 1957, she was cast as Dr. Louise Kendall, in the episode "Strange Quarantine" of the NBC Western  series, The Californians.

Later in 1958, Totter played boarding house owner Beth Purcell in another NBC Western series, Cimarron City. The episodes were supposed to have rotated among star George Montgomery as the mayor, John Smith as blacksmith/deputy sheriff Lane Temple, and Totter, but when the writers failed to feature her character, she left the series. 

In 1960, she was in an episode of Alfred Hitchcock Presents: “ Madame Mystery”. From 1962 to 1963, she starred as homemaker Alice MacRoberts in the ABC situation comedy Our Man Higgins, with Stanley Holloway, Frank Maxwell, and Ricky Kelman. In 1964, she made a guest appearance on CBS's Perry Mason as defendant Reba Burgess in the title role of "The Case of the Reckless Rockhound".

Totter played a continuing role from 1972 to 1976, that of Nurse Wilcox, the efficient head nurse, in the CBS television series Medical Center, with James Daly and Chad Everett. Her last acting role was as a nun, Sister Paul, in a 1987 episode ("Old Habits Die Hard") of CBS's Murder, She Wrote, with Angela Lansbury.

Personal life and death
Totter was married to Dr. Leo Fred, assistant dean of the UCLA School of Medicine, from 1953 until his death in 1995.  The couple had one child, a daughter. On December 12, 2013, just eight days before her 96th birthday, Totter died of a stroke. After a memorial service, her body was cremated and her ashes scattered in the Pacific.

In November 1952, Totter said she was a Republican and had supported Dwight Eisenhower's successful campaign during that year's presidential election.

Filmography

References

External links

 
 

 

1917 births
2013 deaths
American film actresses
American television actresses
American radio actresses
Actresses from Illinois
Actors from Joliet, Illinois
Joliet Central High School alumni
American people of Swedish descent
Metro-Goldwyn-Mayer contract players
20th-century American actresses
American people of Slovenian descent
Western (genre) television actors
Methodists from Illinois
Illinois Republicans
California Republicans